The barracuda is an alcoholic cocktail based on gold rum, Galliano liqueur, pineapple juice, fresh lime juice and topped with Prosecco, according to International Bartenders Association specified ingredients.

See also
 Barracuda
 List of cocktails

References

Cocktails with rum
Cocktails with liqueur
Tiki drinks
Cocktails with lime juice
Cocktails with pineapple juice
Cocktails with Champagne
Bubbly cocktails